Jabłonka-Bory  is a village in the administrative district of Gmina Jabłonka, within Nowy Targ County, Lesser Poland Voivodeship, in southern Poland, close to the border with Slovakia.

References

Villages in Nowy Targ County